Moshe Tery is Chairman of the Israel Securities Authority.  He was initially appointed in 2002 by then-Israeli Finance Minister Silvan Shalom.

Career

Positions he has held include:

Chairman of Leadcom Ltd. (Elgadcom Group)
General manager of the Central Co. Stock Exchange Services (N.E.) Ltd.
General manager of the Israel Investment Center
Vice Director General of Edgar Textile Industries Ltd.
Director of the Tel Aviv Stock Exchange
Director of Israel Chemicals Ltd.
Chairman of Laromme Hotels International Ltd.
Chief Economist in the Securities Division of the Israel Discount Bank

Government appointments

His government appointments include:

Commissioner of the Israel Securities Authority
General Manager of the Israel Postal Authority
Director of the Israel Airport Authority

References

External links
 ISA website
 ISA bid for IOSCO Conference, on Youtube, with Moshe Tery
 "Israeli Regulator Tery Demands More Board Oversight," 6/6/07

Israeli economists
Living people
Year of birth missing (living people)